In enzymology, a raffinose-raffinose alpha-galactosyltransferase is an enzyme that catalyzes the chemical reaction

2 raffinose  1F-alpha-D-galactosylraffinose + sucrose

Hence, this enzyme has one substrate, raffinose, and two products, 1F-alpha-D-galactosylraffinose and sucrose.

This enzyme belongs to the family of glycosyltransferases, to be specific the hexosyltransferases.  The systematic name of this enzyme class is raffinose:raffinose alpha-D-galactosyltransferase. Other names in common use include raffinose (raffinose donor) galactosyltransferase, raffinose:raffinose alpha-galactosyltransferase, and raffinose-raffinose alpha-galactotransferase.

References

 

EC 2.4.1
Enzymes of unknown structure